John Foxe (died 1586), of Aldeburgh, Suffolk, was an English politician.

He was a Member (MP) of the Parliament of England for Aldeburgh in 1584.

References

Year of birth missing
1586 deaths
English MPs 1584–1585
People from Aldeburgh